Malcolm Robert Andrew McLaren (22 January 1946 – 8 April 2010) was an English impresario, visual artist, singer, songwriter, musician, clothes designer and boutique owner, who  combined these activities in an inventive and provocative way. He promoted and managed the bands New York Dolls, the Sex Pistols, and Bow Wow Wow.

Brought up unconventionally by his grandmother after his father, Peter, left the family home, McLaren attended a number of British art colleges and adopted the stance of the social rebel in the style of French revolutionaries the Situationists. McLaren realised that a new protest style was needed for the 1970s, and involved himself in the punk movement, for which he supplied fashions from the Chelsea boutique SEX, which he operated with girlfriend Vivienne Westwood. After a period advising the New York Dolls in the U.S., McLaren managed the Sex Pistols, for which he recruited the nihilistic frontman Johnny Rotten. The issue of a controversial record, "God Save the Queen", satirising the Queen's Jubilee in 1977, was typical of McLaren's shock tactics, and he gained publicity by being arrested after a promotional boat trip outside the Houses of Parliament.

McLaren performed with acclaim as a solo artist, initially focusing on hip hop and world music and later diversifying into funk and disco, the dance fashion for "voguing" and merging opera with contemporary electronic musical forms. When accused of turning popular culture into a cheap marketing gimmick, he joked that he hoped it was true. His first album, Duck Rock  was certified silver in the UK and spawned 2 top-10 singles: "Buffalo Gals" and "Double Dutch".

In his later years, he lived in Paris and New York City, and died of peritoneal mesothelioma in a Swiss hospital.

Early years 
McLaren was born on 22 January 1946 in a flat at 47 Carysfort Road, Stoke Newington, north-east London, to Peter McLaren, a Londoner of Scottish extraction who was at that time serving with the Royal Engineers, and Emily Isaacs, the daughter of tailor Mick Isaacs and independently wealthy Rose Corré Isaacs, whose father had been a Portuguese Sephardic Jewish diamond dealer.

McLaren's parents divorced when he was two after Peter McLaren left the family home due to his wife's serial infidelity: McLaren later alleged that her lovers included the Selfridges magnate Sir Charles Clore and Sir Isaac Wolfson, owner of the retail giant Universal Stores.

Subsequently McLaren was raised by his grandmother Rose, who lived in the house next door at 49 Carysfort Road with her husband and instructed the child early in life that, "To be bad is good because to be good is simply boring".

In September 1951, when McLaren was 5 years old, his mother married Martin Edwards, a rag trade entrepreneur; together they operated the women's-wear wholesale business Eve Edwards with a factory at 117 Whitechapel High Street in London's East End. At his stepfather's insistence, McLaren and his brother Stuart adopted the surname Edwards.

Having been home-educated for a spell after spending a single day at William Patten Primary School in Stoke Newington, McLaren attended the neighbourhood's private Avigdor school and then Davenant Foundation School, which was then in Whitechapel. When his family moved to north London suburb Hendon, McLaren transferred to Orange Hill Grammar School in nearby Burnt Oak.

At the age of 16, McLaren left Orange Hill with three O-levels and was briefly employed in a handful of jobs (including one as an apprentice wine taster) before attending classes at St Martin's School of Art and then undertaking a foundation course at Harrow School of Art. Other arts institutions attended by McLaren over the next seven years included the South East Essex School of Art in Walthamstow, east London – where he was mentored by artist/teacher Keith Albarn – Croydon College of Art and Goldsmiths, where he studied for a fine art degree and organised a memorable free arts festival which featured such performers as King Crimson.

As a student, McLaren became politically engaged; in the summer of 1966 he was arrested for attempting to set light to an American flag outside the US embassy in Grosvenor Square, central London, during a demonstration against the Vietnam War. He was also attracted to the European radical art movement the Situationists, and associated with members of the UK wing King Mob. Both these organisations promoted absurdist and provocative actions as a way of enacting social change. In the spring of 1968 McLaren tried unsuccessfully to travel to Paris to join the demonstrations and, with fellow student Jamie Reid, took part in a student occupation at Croydon. McLaren later grafted some of the movement's ideas into promotion of pop and rock groups.

Fashion design and music

430 King's Road, Vivienne Westwood and New York Dolls 
In October 1971, McLaren took over the back part of the retail premises at 430 King's Road in Chelsea, West London, and sold rock and roll records, refurbished 1950s radiograms and dead stock clothing as In The Back Of Paradise Garage. With the assistance of art-school friend Patrick Casey, McLaren converted the entire ground floor into Let It Rock, with his girlfriend Vivienne Westwood repairing original clothing and making facsimiles.

To part-fund the business, in February 1972 McLaren was paid £50 to marry a former Goldsmiths fellow student, Jocelyn Hakim, so that she could achieve British citizenship. Hakim took the surname Edwards and subsequently gave birth to Jodhi May (later an actress) in 1975. There is no truth in the rumour that McLaren was May's father, which is based on the fact that May's birth surname was her mother's married name.

Let It Rock was patronised by teddy boys and McLaren and Westwood's designs also appeared in such theatrical and cinematic productions such as The Rocky Horror Show and That'll Be The Day. In spring 1973, new clothing based on 40s and 50s tailoring and a range of leather garments with studs inaugurated a new manifestation at the address under the name Too Fast To Live Too Young To Die. Among commissions were costumes for Ken Russell's film Mahler.

In August 1973, McLaren and Westwood visited New York to participate in the National Boutique Fair, where they began an association with the New York Dolls supplying them with stage wear and joining the glam-punk group on tour in the UK and France.

In October 1974, McLaren renamed the outlet SEX to reflect a growing preoccupation with fetish wear and provocation.

In January 1975, McLaren and Westwood designed red patent leather costumes for the New York Dolls and used a Soviet-style hammer and sickle motif for their stage shows in the US as a provocative means of promoting the band. This ploy was not successful and the Dolls soon broke up. Dolls guitarist Johnny Thunders blamed McLaren for the band's demise, stating that he was "the reason why we broke up." McLaren claimed it was Thunders and drummer Jerry Nolan's drug addiction which forced the split. In May 1975, McLaren returned to Britain.

Sex Pistols 
From 1974, McLaren had advised SEX customers Paul Cook and Steve Jones on their musical aspirations, having proposed that one of his shop assistants, Glen Matlock, join them as the bass-player in a group McLaren named Kutie Jones and his Sex Pistols. In the summer of 1975, McLaren ejected the bespectacled guitarist/singer Wally Nightingale from the line-up because he lacked visual appeal.

McLaren's one-time associate Bernie Rhodes (later manager of the Clash) has claimed he spotted a new frontman in another customer, John Lydon, then sporting green hair and torn clothes with the words "I hate" scribbled on his Pink Floyd T-shirt. Lydon, dubbed "Johnny Rotten", joined and McLaren shortened the name to Sex Pistols, stating that he wanted to give the impression of "sexy young assassins".

In May 1977, a few months after Sid Vicious had replaced Matlock, the band released "God Save the Queen" during the week of Queen Elizabeth II's Silver Jubilee. McLaren organised a boat trip down the Thames in which the Sex Pistols would perform their music outside the Houses of Parliament. The boat was raided by the police and McLaren was arrested, thus achieving his goal to obtain publicity.

The band released their album Never Mind the Bollocks, Here's the Sex Pistols in October 1977 and played their last UK gig before embarking upon a U.S. tour in January 1978. During his time managing the band, McLaren was accused by band members (most notably by Lydon) of mismanaging them and refusing to pay them when they asked him for money. McLaren stated that he had planned out the entire path of the Sex Pistols, and in the film The Great Rock 'n' Roll Swindle he set this plan out.

The contractual rights to the Sex Pistols' name rights were disputed in a case brought by Lydon, Jones, Cook and the estate of Sid Vicious in 1979 against Mcaren's management company Glitterbest. In 1986 the High Court awarded the rights to the group's name, The Great Rock 'n' Roll Swindle, the artwork, master tapes and the group's income to Lydon and the others.  In the 2000 film The Filth and the Fury, the surviving members of the Sex Pistols gave their version of events.

McLaren is portrayed by David Hayman in Sid and Nancy and by Thomas Brodie-Sangster in the 2022 Craig Pearce - Danny Boyle FX biographical drama miniseries Pistol.

Other artists 
McLaren was approached by Adam Ant to manage Adam and the Ants following their debut album release in late 1979. Shortly thereafter, three members of the band left to form Bow Wow Wow under McLaren's management. McLaren continued to manage Ant as he found new band members for Adam and the Ants and worked on a new sound and also advised the Slits and Jimmy the Hoover.

The members of Bow Wow Wow also promoted clothing designed by McLaren and Westwood, and he embroiled the group in such controversies as plans to publish a magazine to be titled Chicken, to celebrate sex between individuals under the age of consent.

Solo music career 
In 1983, McLaren released Duck Rock, an album that, in collaboration with producer and co-writer Trevor Horn and the World's Famous Supreme Team (a duo of hip hop radio disc jockeys from New York City who hosted a hip hop and classic R&B show on WHBI 105.9 FM and were among the first DJs to introduce the art of scratching to the world), mixed up influences from Africa and the Americas, including hip hop. The album helped bring hip hop to a wider audience. Two of the singles from the album ("Buffalo Gals" and "Double Dutch") became top-10 hits in the UK, with "Buffalo Gals" a minor hit in some major cities in the US.

In 1984 McLaren turned to electronic music and opera on the single "Madame Butterfly", which reached No.13 in the UK and No.16 in Australia. The producer of the single, Stephen Hague, became much sought after following his work with McLaren on the LP Fans.

McLaren's 1989 album Waltz Darling was a funk/disco/voguing-inspired album. Waltz Darling incorporated elements of his former albums, e.g. spoken verses, string arrangements and eclectic mix of genres but featured such prominent musicians as Bootsy Collins and Jeff Beck with a glitzy, Louisiana-style production aimed at the U.S. market. The singles, "Waltz Darling" and "Something's Jumpin' in Your Shirt" became top-20 radio hits in Europe. A remix of  the single "Deep in Vogue" was instrumental in bringing voguing and ball culture to wider public attention, topping the U.S. dance chart in July 1989 (some nine months before the global success of Madonna's similarly-themed "Vogue") as well as charting in the lower reaches of the UK and Australia pop charts. "Deep in Vogue" is also notable for McLaren's collaborations with vogue performer Willi Ninja and filmmaker Jennie Livingston, who directed the promotional music video and gave McLaren and remix producers Mark Moore and William Orbit permission to sample audio from the soundtrack of her then-unreleased voguing documentary Paris Is Burning.

In 1989, McLaren and composer Yanni arranged the "Flower Duet" into a work called "Aria on Air". The "Flower Duet" theme, taken from the French opera Lakmé by Léo Delibes, had already been used by composer Howard Blake to accompany British Airways commercials since 1984. However, from 1989 McLaren and Yanni further arranged the "Flower Duet" and it featured in BA's "World's Favourite Airline" global advertising campaign of the 1980s and 1990s.

In 1992, McLaren co-wrote the song "Carry On Columbus" for the feature film of the same name. The song plays over the end credits of the film.

In 1994, he recorded the concept album Paris, with appearances by such prominent French stars as the actress Catherine Deneuve, musician Françoise Hardy and fashion designer Sonia Rykiel.

In 1998, McLaren released Buffalo Gals Back 2 Skool (Virgin Records), an album featuring hip hop artists Rakim, KRS-One, De La Soul and producer Henri Scars Struck revisiting tracks from the original Duck Rock album. That year, he also created a band called Jungk. This project was not a commercial success. Around this time he released a track called "The Bell Song" as a single available in a variety of remixes.

McLaren contributed a track, "About Her", to the soundtrack of Quentin Tarantino's 2004 film Kill Bill: Volume 2. The song heavily samples "She's Not There" by the Zombies, and uses Bessie Smith's "St. Louis Blues" by looping the phrase: "My man's got a heart like a rock cast in the sea". Accused of plagiarism by French musician Benjamin Beduneau, McLaren was cleared in November 2005 when a court in Angers, France dismissed the case.

McLaren's solo work, particularly from the Duck Rock period, has been sampled by other artists. In 1999, a group called Dope Smugglaz had a UK Top 20 hit with the track "Double Double Dutch", which made extensive use of samples from McLaren's original "Double Dutch". In 1997, Mariah Carey's "Honey" and its "Bad Boy Remix" sampled "Hey DJ". In 2002, Eminem released a track called "Without Me", which incorporated "Buffalo Gals". In 2007, McLaren's song "World's Famous" was sampled by R&B singer Amerie on the song "Some Like It" from her album Because I Love It.

In 2001, author Paul Gorman published his book The Look: Adventures In Rock & Pop Fashion with a foreword and contributions from McLaren. The 2006 second edition included a CD featuring the track "Deux" from the Paris Remixes album.

Royalty payment controversies 
In 1982, McLaren visited Johannesburg in South Africa. His hit song, "Double Dutch" was taken from "Puleng", by mbaqanga band "The Boyoyo Boys", as was the flip side "Zulus on a Time Bomb", from "Tsotsi". "On The Road To Soweto" was lifted from a General MD Shirinda and the Gaza Sisters song, "He Mdjadji", while two songs were taken from the Mahotella Queens, with "Thina Siyakhanyisa" becoming "Jive My Baby", and "Kgarebe Tsaga Mothusi" becoming "Punk It Up".

McLaren had previously plagiarised the Mahotella Queens song "Umculo Kawupheli", which formed the basis of the Bow Wow Wow hit "See Jungle! (Jungle Boy)". None of the artists concerned received any royalty payments at the time. McLaren was later sued, with a UK judge freezing royalty payments to McLaren. The case was then settled out of court for an undisclosed sum of money, although there's no record of whether any of the final settlement went to the musicians, or to the lawyers involved.

Film production 
In 1984, McLaren turned away from record-making in favour of theatrical and film production, starting with a musical version of the Fans album to be staged off-Broadway with the impresario Joseph Papp. This was to remain in development for three years and involved contributions from the choreographer Tommy Tune.

Simultaneously, Mclaren worked with various collaborators on a film treatment which mixed the story of Beauty and the Beast with the life of the couturier Christian Dior. Titled Fashion Beast, this was among a slate of productions McLaren pitched in Hollywood in the first half of 1985 to such film industry bigwigs as entertainment mogul David Geffen  and Geffen's head of production at his company, Lynda Obst.

In the summer of 1985 McLaren was appointed to the position of production executive at CBS Theatrical Films, the TV and stage arm of CBS Films. Working from an office on the CBS lot and living in a house in the hills above the Hollywood Bowl, McLaren focused on Fans: The Musical and Fashion Beast, for which he commissioned British comic book writer Alan Moore to write a script, and developed a raft of properties including Heavy Metal Surfing Nazis, about post-apocalyptic turf wars among gangs on California's environmentally damaged beaches; The Rock'n'Roll Godfather, a biopic of Led Zeppelin's manager Peter Grant; and Wilde West, based on the notion of Oscar Wilde discovering the roots of rock'n'roll during his celebrated 1882 lecture tour of the US.

McLaren gained interest in the latter project and Fans: The Musical from Steven Spielberg, and when CBS Theatrical Films closed at the end of 1985, was employed as an ideas guru at Spielberg's Amblin Entertainment while continuing to pitch his projects to other studios on a freelance basis. McLaren succeeded in attracting development funding for Fashion Beast from Manhattan nightlife entrepreneur Robert Boykin and the film was optioned by the newly founded independent production house Avenue Pictures, but after several rewrites the project faltered not least when Boykin's health suffered. He died from complications arising from Aids in 1988.

In 2012, Alan Moore adapted the Fashion Beast script for serialisation as a 10-issue comic book published by Avatar Press.

In the early 90s McLaren returned to Europe and working out of London and Paris subsequently produced a number of film and television projects, starting with The Ghosts of Oxford Street, which he co-directed, wrote and starred in. This was broadcast on Christmas Eve that year by British national TV channelChannel 4. This musical history of London's Oxford Street was also narrated by McLaren and included performances by Happy Mondays, Tom Jones, Rebel MC, Kirsty MacColl, John Altman and Sinéad O'Connor.

In 2000, McLaren scripted and presented the six-part series Being Malcolm for the French digital youth channel Jimmy and continued to develop film properties, the most successful of which was the 2006 film Fast Food Nation, which he produced from Eric Schlosser's book Fast Food Nation: The Dark Side of the All-American Meal, having appointed British producer Jeremy Thomas, with whom he had worked with on The Great Rock'n'Roll Swindle, and director Richard Linklater to the project.

Campaign to become Mayor of London 
An article in the New Statesman, published on 20 December 1999, titled "My Vision for London", included the "McLaren Manifesto", and there was speculation that McLaren might stand to be elected as Mayor of London, although ultimately he did not run.

With funds sourced from Sony Music by the rock music entrepreneur Alan McGee, McLaren subsequently launched a campaign to stand as an independent candidate in the inaugural elections for the position of Mayor of London in May 2000.

With a range of proposals, from environmentally-sensitive traffic calming to providing public libraries with licences to serve alcohol, McLaren took to the hustings in protest at "the great political  swindle of the mainstream parties who are plotting to make London expensive, oppressive and boring".

According to McLaren's campaign manager writer/musician Peter Culshaw, the late entry into the Mayoral race by the Labour politician Ken Livingstone forced McLaren out of the running.

Radio and TV projects 
In 2006, McLaren presented the documentary series Malcolm McLaren's Musical Map of London for BBC Radio 2, followed in 2007 by Malcolm McLaren's Life and Times in L.A.

Also in 2007, McLaren competed in a reality TV show for ITV titled The Baron, filmed in the small Scottish fishing village of Gardenstown. The series was due to be shown in August 2007, but was postponed owing to the death of fellow contestant actor Mike Reid shortly after filming was completed. It was eventually broadcast starting on 24 April 2008. During filming McLaren was seen urinating into the harbour and loudly telling assembled inhabitants of the devout town, "Jesus is a sausage", at which point he was physically assaulted by a resident. McLaren came last in the competition, which was won by Reid.

It was announced on 7 November 2007 that McLaren would be one of the contestants in the seventh series of the ITV reality show I'm a Celebrity... Get Me Out of Here!, set in the outback of Australia and premiering on British television on Monday 12 November 2007, but he pulled out the day he had flown to Australia. He told press "it is fake", that he didn't know any of the other celebrities and quite frankly, "he didn't have the time". He was replaced by Katie Hopkins. The following year he featured as one of the 'celebrity hijackers' in the UK TV series Big Brother: Celebrity Hijack, which was broadcast on E4. In his hijack, he encouraged the housemates to remove their clothes, daub themselves in paint and produce an artwork using only their bodies and a bicycle.

About his contribution to culture, McLaren has said about himself: "I have been called many things: a charlatan, a con man, or, most flatteringly, the culprit responsible for turning British popular culture into nothing more than a cheap marketing gimmick. This is my chance to prove that these accusations are true."

Visual art and exhibitions 
While still an art student, McLaren had the first public exhibition of his work in 1967, which was based on an environmental installation staged at the Kingly Street Art Gallery in central London, run by a group of artists including Keith Albarn.

In 1986, McLaren participated in the 6th Sydney Biennale at the invitation of Australian curator Nick Waterlow. Waterlow chose as the theme of the arts festival "Origins Originality + Beyond", and McLaren's involvement was based around his appropriation of Édouard Manet's Le Déjeuner sur l'herbe for the cover of Bow Wow Wow's second album.

In 1988, McLaren's work across activism, art, design, fashion and music was the subject of the exhibition Impresario: Malcolm McLaren and the British New Wave at New York's New Museum Of Contemporary Art.

The 1996 London exhibition I Groaned With Pain presented the fashion designs McLaren created with Vivienne Westwood. In an accompanying video interview by curators Paul Stolper and Andrew Wilson, McLaren declared of the clothing, "I don't know whether it's art. It might be bigger than art. Art has been defined today as not much more than a commodity, and I don't think these things are. They remain, even now, set up in frames, as artefacts, enigmatic.'

In the last decade or so of his life, McLaren returned formally to the visual arts. In 1999, an installation created by McLaren was shown as part of the Bonnefanten's 1999 exhibit Smaak – On Taste in Maastricht. In 2005, this formed the basis of the exhibition Casino of Authenticity and Karaoke at the Zentrum für Kunst und Medientechnologie (Center for Arts and Media Karlsruhe) in Karlsruhe, Germany.

In 2008, New York City public arts group Creative Time premiered nine pieces of McLaren's 21-part sound painting series Shallow via MTV's massive HD screen in Times Square. The series, which was first shown at Art 39 Basel in June that year, was the first instalment of an ongoing public arts content partnership between Creative Time and MTV. The complete version of "Shallow 1–21" was given its full U.S. museum premiere in the Morris Gallery of the Pennsylvania Academy of the Fine Arts (PAFA), in Philadelphia, from 24 October 2009 until 3 January 2010.

In 2009, JRP Ringier published McLaren's book Musical Painting, which featured contributions from other visual artists including Damien Hirst and Jim Lambie. In the afterword, publisher Lionel Bovier wrote, "Malcolm McLaren is and has been artist in the purest sense for his entire adult life."

At the time of his death, McLaren had recently finished a new film work entitled Paris: City Of The XXIst Century, which was first shown at the Baltic Centre for Contemporary Art in Gateshead, UK.

In 2011, the U.S. performance-art biennial festival Performa instituted The Malcolm, an award for the most thought-provoking entry named after McLaren and designed by Marc Newson.

In 2013, The Costume Institute of the New York Metropolitan Museum of Art exhibition "Punk: From Chaos To Couture" included the section "The Couturier Situationists" dedicated to McLaren and Westwood.

Posthumous exhibitions 
An exhibition about McLaren's engagement in fashion was held as part of the Copenhagen International Fashion Fair in August 2014. "Let It Rock: The Look of Music The Sound of Fashion" was curated by Young Kim and Paul Gorman and included sections focusing on each of the six retail outlets McLaren operated with Vivienne Westwood. Original clothing, photographs and ephemera were loaned by the Malcolm McLaren Estate archive and such collectors as British fashion designer Kim Jones and musician Marco Pirroni.

British fashion writer Charlie Porter praised the curation, writing on his blog: "At the Malcolm McLaren show in Copenhagen, the hang of the garments is exceptional."

McLaren's background in the visual arts as a student and practitioner was a major focus of the exhibition Art in Pop held at contemporary art gallery Le Magasin, the Centre National d'Art Contemporain in Grenoble, France, from October 2014 to February 2015. "The main central space is dedicated to Malcolm McLaren, who embodies more than anyone the breaking open of perceptions of what constitutes an artist," wrote Magasin's Yves Aupetitallot in the exhibition introduction.

Aupetitallot curated Art in Pop with Paul Gorman, Young Kim and participating artists John Armleder and John Miller. The exhibition also included contributions from musicians Daniel Johnston, Don Van Vliet (Captain Beefheart), Genesis Breyer P-Orridge and Alan Vega as well as artists who have engaged with music such as Alix Lambert and Takuji Kogo.

The McLaren space at Art in Pop included original examples of fashion designs created with Westwood, including loans from Kim Jones, Marco Pirroni, anthropologist/writer Ted Polhemus and streetwear guru Hiroshi Fujiwara. Photography, ephemera and images from a 1969 student art show were displayed, as well as a painting from the mid-1980s entitled "I Will Be So Bad". The exhibition also included a soundtrack of music made by McLaren, prompting Marie France to describe it as "an invigorating exhibition not just to see but hear as well".

Personal life 
McLaren's personal relationship with Vivienne Westwood ended in about 1980; their son is Joseph Corré. Subsequently, McLaren was romantically involved with Andrea Linz, who was studying fashion at Saint Martin's School of Art. Linz had been a member of the German pop-disco act Chilly and went on to become a fashion designer and model. Their relationship ended when McLaren moved to Los Angeles in 1985.

In Los Angeles, McLaren became the partner of the model/actress Lauren Hutton and they lived together in Hollywood for a number of years. "Malcolm was extraordinary," said Hutton a few months after he died. "Irreplaceable. I'll miss him for ever. He was a dragon's egg, a rare bird, and one of the great unsung heroes of England."Hutton ended the relationship in the late 1980s. 

McLaren was then engaged to the fashion agent Eugena Melián, with whom he lived in Los Angeles and Paris. They worked on a series of projects together; it was at Melián's urging that McLaren recorded his 1994 album Paris.

Subsequently McLaren was the partner of the architect Charlotte Skene-Catling – to whom he was also engaged. Their relationship ended in the late 1990s, when McLaren began a romance with Young Kim, an American woman he met at a party.

Later life and death 

McLaren met Young Kim at a party in Paris; she was his girlfriend for the last 12 years of his life. She moved in with him in 2002, and they lived together in Paris and New York.

He was diagnosed with peritoneal mesothelioma in October 2009, and died of the disease on 8 April 2010 in a hospital in Switzerland. McLaren's last words were said by his son Joseph Corré to have been "Free Leonard Peltier".

Tributes poured in from friends, associates and fans – including John Lydon, who had been at odds with McLaren since the demise of the Sex Pistols. "For me Malc was always entertaining, and I hope you remember that. Above all else he was an entertainer and I will miss him, and so should you," he said in a statement as Johnny Rotten.

In a coffin sprayed with the slogan "Too Fast To Live Too Young To Die", McLaren's funeral was attended by Westwood, Sex Pistols bandmates Paul Cook and Glen Matlock, and celebrities such as Bob Geldof, Tracey Emin and Adam Ant. The funeral was held at One Marylebone, a deconsecrated church in central London.

Bob Geldof later told John Lydon that, at the funeral, "there was a huge row between Vivienne [Westwood] and Bernie. I mean, the man's dead – what are you people doing?"

Lydon recalled, "And hearing this, and the way Bob told it – so Irish and brilliant, so full of humour – I felt really, really sorry for Malcolm at that point. That these sods couldn't even let him die in peace. They were out for their own little angles."

McLaren's body was buried in Highgate Cemetery, North London, to the strains of the Sid Vicious version of "My Way".

In 2012, probate was granted to Young Kim by McLaren's will, which excluded his son Joe Corré from the inheritance.

In April 2013, a headstone was placed on McLaren's grave featuring the slogan "Better a spectacular failure, than a benign success", a paraphrasing of McLaren's claim that the best advice he received came from an art-school teacher, "It is better to be a flamboyant failure than any kind of benign success".

TV and radio documentaries about McLaren 

"The South Bank Show: Malcolm McLaren" was first broadcast on British regional channel London Weekend Television on 8 December 1984. Directed by Andy Harries and introduced by Melvyn Bragg (who noted that McLaren had been described as the "Diaghilev of punk"), the film hinged on McLaren recording tracks in America for his album Fans, and investigated his upbringing, art school years, and work with the New York Dolls, the Sex Pistols, Bow Wow Wow and others. Contributors included Sex Pistol Steve Jones, Boy George and Adam Ant.

"Malcolm McLaren: Artful Dodger" was screened by BBC Two in the wake of McLaren's death on 24 April 2010. Produced and directed by Jeremy Marre and presented by Alan Yentob, the programme included archive footage and contributions from Joe Corré, Young Kim and others.

"Malcolm McLaren: Spectacular Failure" was an hour-long examination of his life and legacy first broadcast on BBC Radio 4 on 25 April 2020 to mark the 10th anniversary of McLaren's death. Produced by Just Radio, with whom McLaren made several radio documentaries, and presented by McLaren's biographer Paul Gorman, contributors included his friend and mayoral campaign manager Peter Culshaw and the British writer and cultural commentator Lou Stoppard, who said: "Malcolm McLaren served as a precursor to the boundary-blurring, genre-defying creativity that is prevalent today. His mix of intense ambition, excitement and engagement with an almost nihilistic, bubbling apathy is something that young people today can very much relate to."

Discography

References

Further reading 
 Bromberg, Craig. The Wicked Ways of Malcolm McLaren. HarperCollins, 1989. 
 Brown, Dalia; Graham, Rodney; Hirst, Damien and McLaren, Malcolm. Malcolm McLaren: Musical Paintings. JRP/Ringier, 2010 
 Macleay, Ian. Malcolm McLaren. John Blake, 2010. 
 Overbury, Steve. Guns, Cash and Rock 'n' Roll: The Managers. Mainstream Pub., 2008. 
 Reynolds, Simon. "Serious Mayhem", London Review of Books, 10 March 2022.
 Taylor, Paul. Impresario: Malcolm McLaren and the British New Wave. Cambridge, Massachusetts: MIT Press, 1988. 
 Walker, John. "Malcolm McLaren and the sources of Punk" in Cross-overs: Art into Pop/Pop into Art. London/New York: Comedia/Methuen, 1987.

External links 
 
 Authentic creativity vs. karaoke culture, TED

1946 births
2010 deaths
Alumni of Croydon College
Alumni of Goldsmiths, University of London
English people of Portuguese-Jewish descent
Burials at Highgate Cemetery
Deaths from cancer in Switzerland
Deaths from mesothelioma
English dance musicians
English hip hop musicians
English music managers
English new wave musicians
English people of Scottish descent
English record producers
English songwriters
Musicians from London
People from Stoke Newington
Impresarios
Sex Pistols
Charisma Records artists
Island Records artists
Epic Records artists
Virgin Records artists
Gee Street Records artists
English expatriates in France
English expatriates in Switzerland
English expatriates in the United States
20th-century English businesspeople
King's Road, Chelsea, London
Jews in punk rock